El Avion De Las Tres is the debut album by the Mexican band AK-7. Their material was recorded in Joel Solis' studio alongside Eusebio "El Chivo" Cortez, both former members of "Los Bukis", a successful Mexican band. Fonovisa has confirmed that the album from AK-7 is already in excess of 60 thousand copies sold in the first months.

Track listing
 Este Corazon Llora
 Cariñito de Mi Vida 
 Claridad (Stella Stai) 
 La Llamada
 Pero Me Acuerdo de Ti 
 Los Vergelitos 
 El Avion de las Tres 
 Valentin de La Sierra 
 Mi Abuelito 
 Lo He Decidido 
 Este Corazon Llora [Balada](Bonus Track)

Charts

References

External links 
 
 

AK-7 albums
2007 albums